Ricoseius is a genus of mites in the Phytoseiidae family.

Species
 Ricoseius loxocheles (De Leon, 1965)

References

Phytoseiidae